Uhm Tae-goo (born November 9, 1983) is a South Korean actor. He is known for his supporting roles in many critically acclaimed films, such as Coin Locker Girl (2015) and The Age of Shadows (2016).

Filmography

Films

Television series

Awards and nominations

References

External links
 

1983 births
Living people
Konkuk University alumni
21st-century South Korean male actors
South Korean male film actors
South Korean male television actors